The Egyptian Royal Yacht SS Safra El-Bahr for the Khedive of Egypt, Alexandria, was  built in 1894 with 675 Gross Register Tonnage. In 1915-1919 she was hired by Royal Navy as patrol vessel. In 1920 she was purchased by G. C. Dracoulis, Ithaca and converted from a yacht to a passenger vessel and renamed SS Ithaki. In 1929 she was purchased by Hellenic Coast Lines, Piraeus, Greece. On 20 April 1941 she was bombed and sunk in an air raid in Suda Bay.

References

Maritime incidents in April 1941
Merchant ships sunk by aircraft
1894 ships
Ships built on the River Clyde
Royal and presidential yachts
Ships sunk by German aircraft